Heston Russell is an Australian retired Special Forces officer.

Early life and education 
Russell joined the Australian Army at the age of 17 and graduated from the Royal Military College of Duntroon in 2006. While at the Australian Defence Force Academy, Russell completed a Bachelor of Arts from the University of New South Wales, majoring in history and Indonesian.

Career 
Following his graduation from the Royal Military College of Duntroon  Russell was posted to his first commissioned appointment as a platoon leader with the 2nd Battalion, Royal Australian Regiment (2 RAR), where he deployed to East Timor to carry out peacekeeping operations.

During his tenure within 2 CDO REGT, Russell completed the commando platoon commander, CEO, and adjutant appointments. These appointments also included four operational deployments to Afghanistan and the Middle East Area of Operations and saw Operational Service in support of several Counterterrorism operations within the Asia-Pacific Region.

In 2016, Russell completed his final operational deployment to Iraq as the Special Operations joint lead planner within the Special Operations Joint Task Force combating ISIS.

In 2017, following his return from his deployment, Russell worked to expand Barry's Bootcamp, the US-originated boutique fitness brand to Australia and Singapore.  Later, Barry's Bootcamp, was brought to Australia and Russell was appointed as its head of operations. In January 2019 Russell was officially discharged from the Australian Defence Force.

Between October 2020 and March 2021, Russell successfully launched and lead the campaign to retain the Meritorious Unit Citations for over 3,000 Special Forces personnel. During this time Russell was also responsible for lobbying members of the Federal Government to unanimously vote for a motion to support the calling of a Royal Commission into Defence and Veteran Suicide.

Following the successful results of these campaigns, Russell established the Charity Veteran Support Force LTD to support Veterans and their families during the conduct of the Royal Commission.

In September 2021, Russell founded the Australian Values Party, registering with the Australian Electoral Commission as a political party that focuses on veterans' rights.

Russell is now the Managing Director of Veteran Support Force (VSF) after stepping down from the [Australian Values Party] in January 2023.

Campaigns 
Russell launched, led, and supported several campaigns supporting veterans:
 Successfully retaining the Meritorious Unit Citation award for over 3,000 Special Forces personnel in the wake of the Brereton report release (October–December 2020).
 Achieving majority approval through the Parliament of Australia to call for a Royal Commission into Defence and Veteran Suicide (March 2021) resulted in the Royal Commission being called by prime minister Scott Morrison on 19 April 2021.

References

External links 
 Official Website

Military personnel from Queensland
Australian military personnel of the Iraq War
Australian military personnel of the War in Afghanistan (2001–2021)
People from Queensland
Royal Military College, Duntroon graduates

Living people

Year of birth missing (living people)